"Got My Country On" is a song recorded by American country music artist Chris Cagle. It was released in August 2011 as the first single from his album, Back in the Saddle. The song was written by Kelly Archer, Justin Weaver, and Danny Myrick.

Critical reception
Billy Dukes of Taste of Country gave the song four and a half stars out of five, calling it "the year's strongest effort from a singer attempting a comeback."

Music video
The music video was directed by Marcel and premiered in October 2011.

Chart performance
"Got My Country On" debuted at number 58 on the U.S. Billboard Hot Country Songs chart for the week of September 17, 2011. In March 2012, it became Cagle's first Top 20 single in four years.

Year-end charts

References

2011 singles
2011 songs
Chris Cagle songs
Bigger Picture Music Group singles
Song recordings produced by Keith Stegall
Music videos directed by Marcel (singer)
Songs written by Danny Myrick
Songs written by Justin Weaver
Songs written by Kelly Archer